Meghdeep Bose is an Indian music producer, composer, arranger and singer. 

His works include songs Swag Se Swagat, Jhoome Jo Pathaan, Khairiyat and film scores including Brahmastra.

Early life 
Meghdeep was born in Indore, Madhya Pradesh, to father Dilip Bose and mother Shraddha Bose. Being born in a family of four generation of musicians, Meghdeep took to music at an early age. He spent most of his childhood in the studios, observing his father as he composed & produced music for various devotional projects

Career 
Meghdeep began his career under his father while assisting him on various Projects.

Bose initially trained under his father Dilip Bose (the first independent music producer of central India). Meghdeep later on received training in western classical piano from Fr. Charles Vas (Trinity Guildhall Curriculum). Bose trained as a vocalist of Rabindra Sangeet under Madhuri Mukherjee and learnt tabla by Pt. Kiran Deshpande 

In 2012, Meghdeep was selected for Berklee College of Music, Boston. However, due to financial constraints, he couldn't make it and instead moved to Mumbai and joined music composer Raju Singh and went on to be his apprentice for the next few years.

In 2015 Amaal Malik overheard Meghdeep's work at YRF Studios, Mumbai and offered him to collaborate on the song "Main Hoon Hero Tera".

In the next few years Meghdeep was commissioned by various composers and artists including Vishal–Shekhar, Shankar–Ehsaan–Loy, Pritam, Salim–Sulaiman, Amit Trivedi, Clinton Cerejo, Mikey McCleary, A Sivamani, Stephen Devassy, Arjun Janya etc.

After collaborating in Tiger Zinda Hai for the song "Swag Se Swagat", Vishal–Shekhar teamed up with Bose for their songs in the 2018 Telugu film Naa Peru Surya, Naa Illu India.

On 8 August 2019, Amaal Mallik & Meghdeep Bose became the second Indian composer-arranger to perform with the Melbourne Symphony Orchestra. Music composer A. R. Rahman was the only Indian composer before this to have collaborated with this orchestra.

Bose has been working with various symphony orchestras for  film songs and scores he produces/arranges. In 2018, AR Rahman commissioned him with two songs to arrange in an orchestral format, which were later performed by the Grand Philharmonic Orchestra from London".

Artists like A. R. Rahman, Yanni, Quincy Jones, Salim–Sulaiman and Shankar–Ehsaan–Loy have had a considerable influence on Bose's music.

Film, TV and Other Works As Music Producer & Arranger
Bose is an active music producer in the Indian film industry.

Bose's recent film projects include songs of Pathaan & Vikram-Vedha with Vishal-Shekhar and Songs of Tu Jhoothi Main Makkar and score of Brahmāstra: Part One – Shiva (as co-composer) with Pritam. 

His other projects include a few of his own independent singles and an album "Main Tera" in collaboration with Azaan Sami Khan.

Selective Film Songs As a Music Arranger-Producer

Selective Film Scores

Non-Film / Independent Works

Film & Television Works As Composer

Awards and nominations

External links
IMDB
https://www.youtube.com/watch?v=gFmExcadd2Y
https://www.netflix.com/watch/81269716?trackId=254015180&tctx=0%2C0%2C50073f6d-6b89-420e-becb-18868e9d7500-70941895%2C60486f22-b7f2-46c3-a2a8-e7ddfa441078_14843247X20XX1596361384583%2C60486f22-b7f2-46c3-a2a8-e7ddfa441078_ROOT%2C
http://iraa.in/Winner.aspx#
https://www.radioandmusic.com/entertainment/editorial/news/210918-clef-music-awards-2021-meghdeep-bose-wins
https://open.spotify.com/artist/1e3Yx1PLC5EP8lz0OFOHda
https://www.youtube.com/watch?v=WdH6Adbl668
https://www.youtube.com/watch?v=VPhudozOwcM
https://www.youtube.com/watch?v=zACzoUH4JDs
https://open.spotify.com/album/4KmD1YMhZ0BmtQYTyHen5n?si=rzjyq9sITs-d2bsu6q_ygg
https://open.spotify.com/album/5KOiUoOwgiyLQdDQEwR8VW?si=LWAUP0aeQbKAb-8A-CDa8A

References

Living people
1991 births
Musicians from Indore
Musicians from Bhopal
People from Bhopal
Indian record producers